Bharath Subramaniyam (born 17 October 2007) is an Indian chess player holding the title of grandmaster.

He learned chess at the age of five years from his father Harishankkar . Starting from 2014, he attended the "Chess Gurukul" school in Chennai, having GM Ramachandran Ramesh as his main teacher. From, March 2019, Bharath also started attending training sessions by GM Alexander Goloshchapov. The sessions were useful in improving his positional play and helped him to reach his norms faster. In January 2020, Bharath was selected for a special training camp sponsored by Microsense networks conducted by former World champion GM Vladimir Kramnik and former World chess challenger GM Boris Gelfand. Bharath is currently training with Indian chess Grandmaster Shyam Sundar. 

He completed his 3rd IM norm in June 2019, at the age of 11 years and 8 months. The title was officially ratified by FIDE in September of the same year.

In January 2022 Bharath earned his third and final GM norm to become India's 73rd grandmaster at the age of 14, by scoring 7.5/9 at the Vergani Cup Open in Cattolica, Italy, and raising his live rating above 2500. As of May 29th 2022, he is the youngest Indian grandmaster.

Main results
 2015 – in August he wins at Suwon (Korea) the Asian Youth Championship in the Under-8 section. In November he wins  the World Youth Championship Under-8 at Porto Carras in Greece with 9,5/ 11; 
 2017 – in August he places 4th in the World Youth Championship Under-10 at Pocos de Caldas in Brazil.
 2019 – in January he places 4th in the blitz section of the Roquetas de Mar Chess Festival. 
 2019 - In June he achieves his final IM norm in Goa open and becomes International master.
 2020 – in February he places 11th at the Aeroflot Open in Moscow with 5,5/ 9, ahead of 54 Grandmasters and getting his first GM norm with a rating performance greater than 2700.
 2021 – in October he is placed 4th(tied for 3rd) at the Junior Rountable Under 21 tournament in Bulgaria with 6.5/9. He made his 2nd GM norm.

References

External links
 
 
 Bharath Subramaniyam chess games at 365Chess.com
 Bharath Subramaniyam stuns GM Zhou Jianchao at Aeroflot Open 2020 (YouTube)
 This 12-year-old IM will floor you with his clarity of thinking and erudition (YouTube)

Indian chess players
Chess International Masters
People from Chennai
Tamil sportspeople
2007 births
Living people